Manohar Lal Munjal (born 4 April 1945) is an Indian acoustical engineer, honorary professor, and INSA senior scientist at the Facility for Research in Technical Acoustics (FRITA) of the Indian Institute of Science. He is known for his studies on aeroacoustics and finite wave analysis of exhaust systems. He is an elected fellow of all the three major Indian science academies viz. Indian Academy of Sciences, Indian National Science Academy, National Academy of Sciences, India as well as the Indian National Academy of Engineering. He has published three books viz. Noise and Vibration Control, Acoustics of Ducts and Mufflers With Application to Exhaust and Ventilation System Design, and IUTAM Symposium on Designing for Quietness and has contributed chapters to books edited by himself and others. The Council of Scientific and Industrial Research, the apex agency of the Government of India for scientific research, awarded him the Shanti Swarup Bhatnagar Prize for Science and Technology, one of the highest Indian science awards for his contributions to Engineering Sciences in 1986.

Biography 

M. L. Munjal, born on 4 April 1945 in the Indian state of Punjab, graduated in mechanical engineering with honors in 1966 from Panjab University and a master's degree in internal combustion engineering from the Indian Institute of Science (IISc) in 1968. He joined IISc as a member of faculty in 1968, simultaneously pursuing his doctoral studies and earned his PhD in 1971. He served IISc in many positions: chairing the department of mechanical engineering during 1991–94, the division of mechanical sciences from 1999 to 2005, and serving as the convener of the Chairmen of Divisions from 2003 to 2005. In between, he had three positions abroad as a visiting faculty member. In 1979, he served at the Technical University of Berlin for a year. From 1986–87, he worked at University of Calgary and Nelson Industries in Wisconsin.  Then in 1994–95 he served as a visiting scientist at Ford Motor Company at their Michigan centre. Post-retirement, he serves as an honorary professor and INSA senior scientist at the Facility for Research in Technical Acoustics (FRITA) of the Indian Institute of Science.

Munjal lives in Bengaluru, Karnataka.

Legacy 
Munjal has done extensive research in acoustics with special focus on noise and vibration. He researched and wrote about designing and optimization of flow passages and his work has applications in the automotive industry and Heating, ventilation and air conditioning systems. His research has been documented in several peer-reviewed articles; and Google Scholar and ResearchGate, online repositories of scientific articles, have listed 221 and 121 of them respectively. He has authored two books, Noise and Vibration Control and Acoustics of Ducts and Mufflers With Application to Exhaust and Ventilation System Design, and has edited another, IUTAM Symposium on Designing for Quietness: Proceedings of the IUTAM Symposium held in Bangalore, India, 12–14 December 2000. He has also contributed chapters to books.

Munjal has undertaken over 100 industrial consultancy projects on noise control and quieter designs and holds two patents and one copyright for his work. He founded Facility for Research in Technical Acoustics (FRITA), a dedicated centre for research in acoustics under the umbrella of the department of mechanical engineering at IISc and has also guided 16 doctoral and over 70 master's scholars in their studies. He sits in the editorial boards of International Journal of Acoustics and Vibration, British Journal of Noise and Health, Indian Journal of Engineering and Material Science and the Annals of the European Academy of Sciences and is a former editorial board member of the International Journal of Conditioning Monitoring and Diagnostic Engineering Management (COMADEM). He was also the guest editor of the Volume 109 of Current Science published in July 2015. His association with government agencies included the chair of the National Committee for Noise Pollution Control (since 1998), and memberships in Science and Engineering Council of the Department of Science and Technology for two terms (1991–94, 2004–07), technology advisory board of the Council of Scientific and Industrial Research (1994–98) and board of research of All India Council for Technical Education (1994–97). He presided the Acoustical Society of India during 1999–2000 and served as the vice president of the Indian National Science Academy from 2011 to 2013. He held the chair of the Karnataka State Industrial Investment and Development Corporation from 1991 to 1994 and is a former member of the director board of the International Institute of Acoustics and Vibration (1995–2001). He has delivered invited or keynote addresses at several seminars and is a speaker designate at the Automotive Noise & Vibration Congress being held in March 2017. He also sits in the Senate of the Indian Institute of Technology Ropar.

Books

Chapters

Selected articles

Awards and honors 
During his early years in research, Munjal was awarded the Young Scientist Medal by the Indian National Science Academy in 1975; the award citation mentioned about the Significant Contribution in Noise Control and Vehicle Dynamics. In 1980, the Acoustical Society of India selected his article in the Journal of Acoustical Society of India (JASI) for the Sir C.V. Raman Award and three years later, another of his articles fetched him the 1983 Nelson Acoustical Paper Award of the Journal of the Acoustical Society of America; he would receive the Sir C.V. Raman Award a second time in 2007. The Council of Scientific and Industrial Research awarded him the Shanti Swarup Bhatnagar Prize, one of the highest Indian science awards in 1986. He received the Professor Rustom Choksi Award of the Indian Institute of Science in 1995 and the Professor S. Bhagwantam Award of the Acoustical Society of India in 2005; in between, he received the Mira Paul Memorial Award of the Acoustical Foundation for Education and Charitable Trust (AFECT) in 2000. The Defence Research and Development Organisation awarded him the Academy Excellence Award for his contributions in the development of practical solutions for meeting defence and civilian requirements, the same year as he received the Jawaharlal Nehru National Award of the Madhya Pradesh Council for Science and Technology. He was awarded the Professor Jai Krishna Memorial Award of the Indian National Academy of Engineering in 2013.

Munjal, an honorary fellow of the International Institute of Acoustics and Vibration, was elected as a fellow by the Indian National Science Academy and the Indian Academy of Sciences in 1987 and the National Academy of Sciences, India followed suit in 1990. He is also a fellow of the Indian National Academy of Engineering and the Acoustical Society of India. He is a Distinguished International Member of the Institute of Noise Control Engineering (INCE), the only Indian to receive the honor, and a member of the European Academy of Acoustics and Vibration. He is also an honorary fellow of the International Institute of Acoustics and Vibration. The award orations delivered by Munjal include M. S. Narayanan Memorial Lecture Award of the Acoustical Society of India in 1995 and the Dr. Guru Prasad Chatterjee Memorial Lecture of the Indian National Science Academy in 2006.

See also 
 Duct (flow)
 Muffler

Notes

References

External links 
 

Recipients of the Shanti Swarup Bhatnagar Award in Engineering Science
1945 births
Indian scientific authors
Fellows of the Indian Academy of Sciences
Indian mechanical engineers
20th-century Indian inventors
Engineers from Punjab, India
University of the Punjab alumni
Indian Institute of Science alumni
Academic staff of the Indian Institute of Science
Academic staff of the Technical University of Berlin
Academic staff of the University of Calgary
Ford people
Fellows of the Indian National Science Academy
Fellows of The National Academy of Sciences, India
Indian acoustical engineers
Living people
Fellows of the Indian National Academy of Engineering
20th-century Indian engineers